Sanctuary is the seventh studio album by American singer and songwriter Donna de Lory, released by Nutone Music on March 24, 2009.

Track listing

See also
 Om Namah Shivaya
 Lokah Samastah Sukhino Bhavantu
 Om

References 

2009 albums
Donna De Lory albums